National Route A003 also known as Tigre Access is an -long four-lane highway. It goes from the junction with National Route 9 and Camino de Cintura (Provincial Route 4) to the town of Tigre, passing the towns of: 
Boulogne
San Isidro
Béccar
Victoria
Virreyes
San Fernando

Administration
In 1993 the Federal Government opened a bid for the Buenos Aires road access network. The winner for the maintenance contract for the North Access roads was Autopistas del Sol. North Access includes Avenida General Paz, National Route A003,  and a portion of National Route 8, National Route 9.

Autopistas del Sol signed the Concession Contract on 26 May 1994. Tolls started being collected in August 1996, after the company finished the road improvements according to the contract.

The concession ends on 31 December 2020.

References

National roads in Buenos Aires Province
Tourism in Argentina